Cerro Volcánico (also known as Fonck) is a cinder cone in Argentina, located southeast of the massive stratovolcano of Tronador.  The cone produced a single andesite lava flow, which has been bracketed in age between 70,000 and 14,000 years ago.

Sources

See also
List of volcanoes in Argentina
El Bolsón, Río Negro
El Bolsón Airport

Cinder cones
Volcanoes of Río Negro Province
Subduction volcanoes
Mountains of Argentina